WRFC may refer to:

Football clubs

Waterloo Rovers F.C., based in Welshpool, Wales
Wellington Recreation F.C., based in County Antrim, Northern Ireland
Welton Rovers F.C., based in Somerset, England
Willand Rovers F.C., based in Devon, England

Rugby union clubs

Wainuiomata Rugby Football Club, based in Wellington, New Zealand
Washington Rugby Football Club, based Washington DC, United States
Waterloo R.F.C.
Welwyn RFC
Westcliff RFC
Westoe RFC
Williams Rugby Football Club, based in Massachusetts, United States
Wimbledon RFC
Winscombe R.F.C.
Worcester Rugby Football Club, based in Worcester, England
Worthing Rugby Football Club

Broadcasting

WRFC (AM), a radio station (960 AM) licensed to Athens, Georgia, United States